The 1975 Soviet football championship was the 43rd seasons of competitive football in the Soviet Union and the 37th among teams of sports societies and factories. Dinamo Kiev won the championship becoming the Soviet domestic champions for the seventh time.

Honours

Notes = Number in parentheses is the times that club has won that honour. * indicates new record for competition

Soviet Union football championship

Top League

First League

Relegation Play-Off
 [Tashkent]
 Zvezda Perm     2-1 UralMash Sverdlovsk

Second League (finals)

 [Chimkent]

Top goalscorers

Top League
Oleg Blokhin (Dinamo Kiev) – 18 goals

First League
Anatoliy Ionkin (Kairat Alma-Ata) – 27 goals

References

External links
 1975 Soviet football championship. RSSSF